Andrew Barrowman (born 27 November 1984) is a Scottish retired professional footballer, who played as a striker. A journeyman, Barrowman played for 15 different sides during his career, including Rangers, Ross County and Dunfermline Athletic in Scotland and Birmingham City and Walsall in England.

Career

Birmingham City
Barrowman was born in Wishaw, North Lanarkshire. He joined Birmingham City at the age of 16, having been with Rangers for four years as a schoolboy. In 2002, he represented Scotland under-19s in the first qualifying round for the 2003 UEFA European Under-19 Championship. He had previously represented Scotland at other youth levels.

He signed his first senior contract at Birmingham for the start of the 2003–04 season, but made his debut in the Football League as a Crewe Alexandra player, in a match against Bradford City on 14 October 2003, after signing on a month-long loan. He hit his first goal in his next match, a 3–0 victory against Derby County four days later.

Between November and the close of the season, he played once in the Premier League for Birmingham City, at home against Leicester City. In the summer of 2004, his contract was renewed.

Loaned to Blackpool for the first three months of the 2004–05 season, Barrowman made his debut against Sheffield Wednesday, coming on as a substitute in a 2–1 home loss. He walked out on the club after another substitute appearance.

Walsall
Barrowman would prove never to become a regular squad member at St Andrew's. In January 2006 he signed for Walsall. He made his debut in a 5–0 defeat to Brentford, which proved to be the final act of manager Paul Merson's spell as manager. Barrowman gave away a penalty in this game with a "bizarre handball" with the score at 4–0. His fortunes improved the week after when he helped to rescue a point on his home debut against Scunthorpe United. With Walsall down to ten men, Barrowman latched onto a long ball and lobbed the goalkeeper to make it 2–2.

Return to Scotland
On 26 July 2006, Barrowman returned to Scotland and signed a one-year contract with Scottish Premier League club Kilmarnock, but after initially failing to break into the first team he joined Queen of the South on a month's loan during September. This loan deal was subsequently extended until the end of December. On 1 February 2007, after his release from Rugby Park, he signed a short-term contract with Queen of the South until the end of the season.

Barrowman scored once for Queen of the South, his goal coming in a 2–2 draw against future club Dundee on 17 March 2007. He signed for Ross County for the 2007–08 season. He hit terrific form during his first season with County, scoring a total of 29 goals, 24 in the league, which helped the club to win the Second Division championship. In late May he turned down a contract extension with County in the hope of moving to a bigger club. Inverness Caledonian Thistle manager Craig Brewster captured his main transfer target on 25 June 2008 when, after much deliberation, Barrowman committed himself to a three-year contract with the club. He scored on his league debut in a 2–0 win over Aberdeen.

Despite scoring on his debut, Barrowman struggled to live up to his potential and found himself in and out of the Inverness team in his first season.

Ross County, Dunfermline & Dundee
On 1 February 2010, Barrowman re-signed for title challengers Ross County on an 18-month deal after securing a release from Inverness. He contributed an assist for the second goal as Ross County eliminated Celtic on their way to the 2010 Scottish Cup Final. Barrowman played the whole game as Ross County lost 3–0 to Dundee United. On 12 October 2010, he returned to first-team duty after two months out with a broken foot to score a late equaliser against Partick Thistle in the semi-final of the Scottish Challenge Cup; Ross County won the penalty shootout to qualify for the final. He then scored the opening goal in the final as Ross County won the trophy beating Queen of the South 2–0.

On 3 June 2011, he left Ross County to join SPL newcomers Dunfermline Athletic on a two-year contract. On 26 March 2013, Dunfermline applied to enter into administration Two days later the club announced that eight players had been made redundant with Barrowman amongst them.

On 31 March 2013, it was announced that Barrowman had signed a deal with Dundee until the end of the season, following his release from Dunfermline.

Livingston, Morton and return to Dunfermline
Barrowman signed for Livingston on 23 August 2013, in a deal lasting through to January 2014. He then extended his contract until the end of the season. He was released in May 2014.

After leaving Livingston, Barrowman signed for League One side Greenock Morton. He was released by mutual consent in January 2015. On 13 January 2015, the same day he left Morton, Barrowman signed for former club Dunfermline Athletic on a short term six-month deal. The switch was part of a swap deal which saw Ross Forbes go the other way and head to Morton. He made his second Dunfermline debut at the first opportunity, starting in a 2–2 draw against Airdrieonians on 17 January 2015.

Albion Rovers
In July 2015, Barrowman signed for Albion Rovers alongside former Raith Rovers midfielder Mark Ferry. His season with Rovers was hampered by injury, though he did make 25 appearances across all competitions, scoring 4 times for the Scottish League One side. At the end of the 2015–16 season, Barrowman confirmed his retirement from football. Towards the end of his playing career, Barrowman had started a degree course in business management.

Arthurlie
In the 2018–2019 season, Barrowman made a return to football with Junior club Arthurlie where he made a handful of appearance before going back into retirement due to injury.

Post-career
After retiring at the end of the 2015–16 season, Barrowman became Scottish brand manager for sportswear firm Joma at the beginning of 2017.

Honours
Ross County
Scottish Second Division: 2007–08
Scottish Challenge Cup: 2010–11
Morton
Scottish League One: 2014–15

References

External links

1984 births
People educated at Coltness High School
Albion Rovers F.C. players
Birmingham City F.C. players
Blackpool F.C. players
Crewe Alexandra F.C. players
Dundee F.C. players
Dunfermline Athletic F.C. players
Greenock Morton F.C. players
Livingston F.C. players
Inverness Caledonian Thistle F.C. players
Kilmarnock F.C. players
Living people
Mansfield Town F.C. players
Sportspeople from Wishaw
Premier League players
Queen of the South F.C. players
Rangers F.C. players
Ross County F.C. players
Scottish Football League players
Scottish footballers
Scottish Premier League players
English Football League players
Walsall F.C. players
Association football forwards
Scotland youth international footballers
Scottish Professional Football League players
Footballers from North Lanarkshire